Kaavi is a municipality of Finland. It is located in the Northern Savonia region. Kaavi is also a part of historical Karelia. Neighbouring municipalities are Kuopio, Juuka, Outokumpu, Polvijärvi and Tuusniemi.

The municipality is unilingually Finnish.

Sights and activities

 Telkkämäki Nature Reserve (Heritage Farm)
 Juutila Foundry Museum (the only sand casting museum in the Nordic countries, foundry since 1881)
 Vaikkojoki River; shooting the rapids, fishing, hiking, canoeing
 Kaavi Blues Festival in June
 Summer theaters in Luikonlahti and Maarianvaara 
 Kaavi Church
 Orthodox Chapel in Luikonlahti

Twin towns 
 Mõniste, Estonia
 Võru County, Estonia

Notable people
Harri Hakkarainen, javelin thrower
Isto Hiltunen, musician
Matti Koivunen, ice hockey player
Seppo Kononen, journalist, had award 2011 (Suomen kuvalehti)
Hugo Niskanen, runner
Mira Salo, Miss Finland

References

Further reading
Koillis-Savo (newspaper)

External links

Municipality of Kaavi – Official website

 
Populated places established in 1875